Jhonatan Alexis Camargo Mendoza (born July 31, 1988) is a Venezuelan professional racing cyclist.

Major results

2008
 3rd Road race, National Road Championships
 5th Overall Vuelta al Táchira
1st Stage 8
2010
 4th Overall Vuelta al Táchira
1st Stage 6
2011
 9th Overall Vuelta al Táchira
1st  Mountains classification
1st Stage 10
2012
 7th Overall Vuelta al Táchira
2013
 3rd Overall Vuelta a Venezuela
 8th Overall Vuelta al Táchira
2014
 3rd Overall Vuelta al Táchira
1st  Points classification
1st  Mountains classification
1st Stages 4, 7, 8 & 9
 4th Overall Vuelta a Venezuela
 10th Overall Tour de Guadeloupe
1st Stage 7
2015
 5th Overall Vuelta al Táchira
2016
 5th Overall Vuelta al Táchira
2020
 7th Overall Vuelta al Táchira

External links

1988 births
Living people
Venezuelan male cyclists
People from Táchira
20th-century Venezuelan people
21st-century Venezuelan people